The University of Augsburg is a university located in the Universitätsviertel section of Augsburg, Germany. It was founded in 1970 and is organized in 8 Faculties.

The University of Augsburg is a relatively young campus university with approx. 18,000 students in October 2012. About 14% of its students come from foreign countries, a larger percentage than at comparable German universities.

In October 2011 Sabine Doering Manteuffel succeeded Alois Loidl as rector of the university. She is the first female rector of a Bavarian university.

Organisation

The university is divided into 8 faculties:

 Faculty of Economics and Business (founded 1970)
 Faculty of Law (founded 1971)
 Faculty of Catholic Theology (founded 1971)
 Faculty of Philosophy and Social Sciences (founded 1972)
 Faculty of History and Philology (founded 1972)
 Faculty of Mathematics and Natural Sciences (founded 1981)
 Faculty of Applied Computer Science (founded 2003)
 Faculty of Medicine (founded 2016, in development)

Campus

The individual faculties, the administration offices (including the Student Service Centre), the refectory, cafeterias, bars, and the libraries are all close together.

History

The University of Augsburg was founded in 1970. It is one of the new, modern universities in Bavaria, and with approximately 18,000 (October 2012) students it is still of a manageable size. It attracts students from far beyond its immediate catchment area. About 20% of the German students come from outside Bavaria, and at 14% its share of foreign students is larger than at comparable universities.

The University of Augsburg maintains partnerships with the Universities of Pittsburgh (USA), Osijek (Croatia) and Iaşi (Romania), and the Far Eastern State University of Humanities, which is in Khabarovsk (Russia). It has cooperation agreements with over forty universities in Europe, Asia, South Africa, North America and Latin America. The number of ERASMUS exchange programmes also continues to grow. There are currently exchange programmes with more than 130 universities throughout Europe.

Anyone who has studied or carried out research here can keep in touch with the University of Augsburg once they have returned home. “Alumni Augsburg International” is a network for Augsburg students, too, as they can use it to find contacts.

University library
Augsburg University library consists of the central library plus libraries for social sciences, humanities and natural sciences.
It was founded along with the university in 1969 and was at first situated in the ducal residence (Fronhof). In 1970, it was moved to the campus of the old university at Memminger Straße. The new central library on the current campus south of Augsburg opened in 1984. The library comprises a total of some 2.0 million items (as of 2007).

Professional language teaching

The University of Augsburg's Language Centre provides tuition in modern languages. Students of philology receive practical language training in English, French, Spanish, Italian and Portuguese. In addition to this, the Language Centre offers courses specifically tailored to law and economics students, as well as the opportunity to study other languages such as Russian, Turkish or Japanese. Foreign students can improve their German language skills in tandem with their other studies. The University of Augsburg and the University of Applied Sciences work closely together in a joint testing centre for German as a Foreign Language (“TestDaF-Zentrum”), which tests the German language skills of international students.

Partnerships
The University of Augsburg has cooperation agreements with over 40 universities in Europe, Asia, South Africa, North America and Latin America.
Particularly close partnerships are maintained with the following 4 universities
University of Pittsburgh (United States)
University of Dayton (United States)
University of Osijek (Croatia)
University of Iaşi (Romania)
Far Eastern State University of Humanities, Khabarovsk (Russia)

Occupation and Protest 2009
On the 17. November 2009 over 500 students occupied the lecture room number 1 to call attention to the bad conditions in Augsburg and the entire German educational system. Specifically, they protested against the need for university students to pay tuition fees and what they perceived as a decline in education quality in the German high school system.

They occupied the hall until the 22. December, using it as a plenary meeting room, holding discussions, organizing theatre and concert performances, showing films, and presenting their claims to the university administration and the Bavarian state. They agreed to end the sit-in because the university vice-president gave assurances that he would solve the problems, which are part of the university itself.

Eventually, all German states scrapped the experiment with university tuition fees in public universities, after mass student protests.

References

External links

University of Augsburg website 
English version of the website 

 
Educational institutions established in 1970
1970 establishments in West Germany
Augsburg